Giacomo del Pò (1654 – 15 November 1726), also spelled del Po, was an Italian painter of the Baroque. He was born in Palermo (other sources say Rome or Naples), the son of Pietro del Pò who was also his teacher.

He was admitted to the Roman Accademia di San Luca. He was chiefly occupied in decorating the mansions of the Neapolitan nobility with emblematical and allegorical subjects. Rome possesses only two of his pictures, one in the church of Sant'Angelo in Pescheria, and the other in Santa Marta al Collegio Romano.

He also worked in Naples, where he painted frescoes for the Palatine chapel in the Royal Palace. He was a contributor to the scenography of the operas Giasone, il Minotauro, and Arianna at the Teatro San Bartolomeo in Naples. He collaborated with Francesco di Maria and Francesco de Mura, in the frescoes for the Palazzo Carafa and the palace of the Prince Caracciolo de Avellino. He painted frescoes in the gallery of the Marquis of Genzano. He also painted frescoes in the Milano Chapel of San Domenico Maggiore and in the church of San Gregorio Armeno. he painted canvases for Church of Santa Maria di Sette Dolori and Santa Teresa degli Scalzi. He also painted in the Basilica of San Antonio and the cathedral in Sorrento. He painted frescoes in the Belvedere palace in Vienna for Eugene of Savoy. He died in Naples in 1726.

Notes

References

1654 births
1726 deaths
17th-century Italian painters
Italian male painters
18th-century Italian painters
Painters from Palermo
Italian Baroque painters
Painters from Naples
Fresco painters
Catholic painters
18th-century Italian male artists